2 Federal is a collaborative mixtape by American rappers Moneybagg Yo and Yo Gotti. The mixtape was released on October 31, 2016, by N-Less Entertainment and Collective Music Group. It features a sole guest appearance from Blac Youngsta. Meanwhile, the mixtape's production was handled by members of 808 Mafia such as Gezin and TM88, K Swisha, Karltin Bankz, Ben Billions, and Tay Keith, among others. This album serves as the second installment of his Federal series.

Track listing
Credits were adapted from Tidal.

Charts

References

2016 mixtape albums
Yo Gotti albums
Sequel albums
Albums produced by TM88
Albums produced by Tay Keith
Moneybagg Yo albums